P. P. Chitharanjan is an Indian politician serving as the MLA of Alappuzha constituency since May 2021.

Mr. Chitharanjan belongs to the CPIM and contested the State Assembly Elections from the Alappuzha Constituency. He won the election by beating Dr. K.S. Manoj of the INC. 

Mr. Chitharanjan also served as the Board Member and Chairman of the Matsyafed 
which is the apex corporation in the Fisheries sectors of the state in which hundreds of smaller, regional co-operatives in the coastal sector are affiliated.

References 

Kerala MLAs 2021–2026
Communist Party of India (Marxist) politicians from Kerala
Year of birth missing (living people)
Living people